TKK can stand for:

My Life with the Thrill Kill Kult band's nickname
Teknillinen korkeakoulu (Helsinki University of Technology) - a former Finnish university
IATA Airport Code for Chuuk International Airport
Tanda Kecakapan Khusus, Indonesian Scout merit badges
Tokyu Corporation (Tokyo KyuKo Railway)